Dimitrijević (Cyrillic script: Димитријевић) is a Serbian patronymic surname derived from a masculine given name Dimitrije. It may refer to:

Bojan Dimitrijević (actor) (born 1973), Serbian actor
Bojan Dimitrijević (politician) (born 1963), Serbian Minister of Trade, Tourism, and Services (2004–2007)
Braco Dimitrijević (born 1948), Bosnian artist, born in Sarajevo, Bosnia
Dimitrije Dimitrijević, former Bosnian football player who played between the two world wars
Dragutin Dimitrijević (1876–1917), Serbian soldier and nationalist leader of the Black Hand group
Jelena Dimitrijević (born 1862), Serbian woman writer
Miloš Dimitrijević (born 1984), Serbian soccer player
Vojin Dimitrijević (1932–2012), Serbian human rights activist
Zoran Dimitrijević (born 1962), Serbian midfielder
Zorica Dimitrijević-Stošić, Serbian pianist and accompanist, former professor of piano at the Faculty of Music in Belgrade

Serbian surnames
Patronymic surnames
Surnames from given names